Franz Xaver Wagenschön (2 September 1726, Littisch, Bohemia (now Litíč, Czech Republic) – 1 January 1790, Vienna) was a German Bohemian painter of the Rococo and Neoclassical styles. His works are to be found in the Kunsthistorisches Museum of Vienna, in Graz and in Upper Austria.

Life
In 1747 he went to Vienna to attend the local art academy, becoming a member of it in 1770. He was also a student of Paul Troger. In his early years he was a carriage painter, producing portraits of noblemen, working in this vein at the end of the 1760s for the children of Maria Theresa of Austria, especially Marie Antoinette (later queen of France), and in 1763 painting the panels for the golden Imperialwagen. In later life he produced religious and allegorical works influenced by the Italian Baroque. He was also known for his works for monasteries and churches, including Poysdorf, Göttweig, Ollersbach, Scheibbs, Purgstall and Tulln.

Gallery

Sources
Radka Miltová: "Franz Xaver Wagenschön a "Metamorphoses d'Ovide en rondeaux“

External links

1726 births
1790 deaths
18th-century Austrian painters
18th-century Austrian male artists
Austrian male painters
18th-century Bohemian painters
18th-century male artists
18th-century German painters
18th-century German male artists
German male painters
Baroque painters
Czech male painters
German Bohemian people
Austrian people of German Bohemian descent
People from Trutnov District